Wygranka  is a village in the administrative district of Gmina Kłoczew, within Ryki County, Lublin Voivodeship, in eastern Poland.  The village has an approximate population of 100.

References

Wygranka